Beyond the Veil is the second full-length album by the Norwegian band Tristania. It is the last album to feature the band's former vocalist, guitarist and core songwriter, Morten Veland.

Background and influence

Tristania stood apart from the other bands of the genre with their use of three distinct vocal styles in the "operatic soprano Vibeke Stene, clean-singing counter-tenor Østen Bergøy, and harsh, black metal-style shrieker Morten Veland". Beyond the Veil made use of a ten-member choir and featured violin passages from Pete Johansen of The Sins of Thy Beloved, earning "rave reviews" across Europe. By then, the band had risen to "the top of the gothic metal heap" with their "lush, symphonically enhanced" approach. The album features "tender ethereal female voices" and "the brutality and harshness", making it a promoter on the gothic metal scene. They were "dealt a potentially crippling blow" when singer, guitarist and principal composer Veland left the group to form Sirenia. Tristania has continued to prosper with subsequent releases and has since been "regarded as one of the world's premiere goth metal bands".

Track listing

Personnel

Tristania
 Vibeke Stene – lead vocals, backing vocals
 Morten Veland – rhythm guitar, harsh vocals, backing vocals
 Anders H. Hidle – lead guitar, backing vocals
 Rune Østerhus – bass
 Einar Moen – synth and programming
 Kenneth Olsson – drums, backing vocals

Session members
 Østen Bergøy – clean vocals
 Pete Johansen – violin
 Jan Kenneth Barkved – clean vocals on "Heretique", choir
 Hilde T. Bommen Rasmussen, Maiken Stene, Sissel B. Stene, Jeanett Johannessen, Rino A. Kolstø – choir

References

1999 albums
Tristania (band) albums
Napalm Records albums